Lebd-e Sofla (also Romanized as Lebd-e Soflá) is a village in Bazoft Rural District, Bazoft District, Kuhrang County, Chaharmahal and Bakhtiari Province, Iran. At the 2006 census, its population was 67, in 10 families.

References 

Populated places in Kuhrang County